The Dissolution of Colleges Act 1547 (1 Edw 6 c 14) was an Act of the Parliament of England.

The whole Act was repealed by section 39(1) of, and Schedule 5 to, the Charities Act 1960.

References
Halsbury's Statutes,

See also
 Chantry § Abolition of Chantries Acts, 1545 and 1547

Acts of the Parliament of England (1485–1603)
1547 in law
1547 in England